Margaret Eleanor Whiting (July 22, 1924 – January 10, 2011) was an American popular music and country music singer who gained popularity in the 1940s and 1950s.

Biography

Youth
Whiting was born in Detroit, Her family moved to Los Angeles in 1929, when she was five years old. Her father, Richard, was a composer of popular songs, including the classics "Hooray for Hollywood", "Ain't We Got Fun?", and "On the Good Ship Lollipop". Her sister, Barbara Whiting, was an actress (Junior Miss, Beware, My Lovely) and singer.

An aunt, Margaret Young, was a singer and popular recording artist in the 1920s. Whiting's singing ability was noticed at an early age and at seven she sang for singer-lyricist Johnny Mercer, with whom her father had collaborated on some popular songs, including "Too Marvelous for Words". In 1942, Mercer co-founded Capitol Records and signed Margaret to one of Capitol's first recording contracts.

Recording career
Whiting's first recordings were as featured singer with various orchestras. In 1944, her version of "Moonlight in Vermont", with Billy Butterfield's Orchestra, sold over one million copies, and was awarded a gold disc by the RIAA.
Other recordings included "That Old Black Magic", with Freddie Slack and His Orchestra (1942) and "It Might as Well Be Spring", with Paul Weston and His Orchestra (1945).

In 1945, Whiting began to record under her own name. "A Tree in the Meadow" was a number 1 hit in the summer of 1948 and her duet with country music star Jimmy Wakely, "Slippin' Around", was another number one hit in 1949 selling 1.75 million copies and she was titled "Queen of the Jukeboxes". Other recordings include:
"All Through the Day" (1945, becoming a bestseller in the spring of 1946)
"In Love in Vain" (1945)
(these two from the movie "Centennial Summer")
"Guilty" (1946)
"Pretending" (1946)
"Oh, But I Do" (1946)
"Baby, It's Cold Outside" (duet with Johnny Mercer, 1949)
"Blind Date", a novelty record with Bob Hope (1950)
"Far Away Places" (1949)
"Silver Bells" (duet with Jimmy Wakely, 1951)

Until the mid-1950s Whiting continued to record for Capitol, but as she ceased to record songs that charted as hits, she switched to Dot Records in 1957 and to Verve Records in 1960. Whiting returned to Capitol in the early 1960s and then signed with London Records in 1966. On London, Whiting landed one last major hit single in 1966, "The Wheel of Hurt", which hit No. 1 on the Easy Listening singles chart. Her final solo albums were made for Audiophile (1980, 1982, 1985) and DRG Records (1991). Her distinguished conductors and musical arrangers through the years included Buddy Bregman, Frank DeVol, Russell Garcia, Johnny Mandel, Billy May, Marty Paich, Nelson Riddle, Pete Rugolo, and Paul Weston.

Radio career
Whiting co-starred on the 15-minute musical programs The Jack Smith Show and Club Fifteen. She also was a vocalist on The Eddie Cantor Show and was in the cast of The Philip Morris Follies of 1946 and The Railroad Hour. Additionally, she was hostess on the Spotlight Revue and a featured singer on the transcribed Barry Wood Show. She also appeared in the role of a young Sophie Tucker in the January 13, 1957 CBS Radio Workshop presentation of "No Time For Heartaches".

Television career
Margaret and Barbara Whiting starred as themselves in the situation comedy Those Whiting Girls. The show, produced by Desilu Productions, aired on CBS as a summer replacement series (in place of I Love Lucy) between July, 1955 and September, 1957.

Margaret Whiting was a regular guest on variety shows and talk shows throughout the 1950s, 1960s and 1970s, including Faye Emerson's Wonderful Town, when the musical series focused on Whiting's hometown of Detroit; The Big Record, The Bob Hope Show, The Colgate Comedy Hour, The Tony Martin Show, The David Frost Show, The Ed Sullivan Show, The George Jessel Show, The Guy Mitchell Show, The Jonathan Winters Show, The Merv Griffin Show, The Mike Douglas Show, The Nat King Cole Show, Over Easy, The Pat Boone Chevy Showroom, The Patti Page Show, The Red Skelton Hour, The Steve Allen Show, The Ford Show Starring Tennessee Ernie Ford, The Texaco Star Theater, The Tonight Show Starring Johnny Carson, The Virginia Graham Show, and The Voice of Firestone.

In 1960, Whiting appeared as Vinnie Berkeley in one of the last episodes, "Martial Law", of the ABC/Warner Brothers western series, Colt .45. Paul Picerni was cast in the same segment as Duke Blaine.

In 1984, Whiting appeared in the television musical movie Taking My Turn. It was basically a filmed version of the 1983 off-Broadway show in which she appeared. This ensemble show also included Marni Nixon, Tiger Haynes, and Cissy Houston among others. The music was composed by Gary William Friedman with lyrics by Will Holt. The revue was centered on issues regarding aging. The stage production opened at New York City's Entermedia Theatre on June 9, 1983. It went on to win the 1984 Outer Critic's Circle Award for Best Lyrics/Music and was nominated for the 1984 Drama Desk Award for Best Musical (losing to Stephen Sondheim's Sunday In the Park With George). A cast recording of the stage production was released and subsequently re-released on CD.

In the 2000s, Whiting was interviewed in several documentaries about singers and songwriters of her era, including Judy Garland: By Myself (2004), Fever: The Music of Peggy Lee (2004), Anita O'Day: The Life of a Jazz Singer (2007), Johnny Mercer: The Dream's on Me (2009), The Andrews Sisters: Queens of the Music Machines (2009) and Michael Feinstein's American Songbook (2010).

Cabaret Master Teacher
From 1989 through 2001, Whiting was the Artistic Director of the annual Cabaret and Performance Conference at the Eugene O'Neill Theater Center in Waterford Connecticut. With other performers such as Julie Wilson and Anne Francine as well as musical directors like Tex Arnold, she spent 10 days instructing selected professionals and amateurs in the cabaret performance process.

Marriages
Whiting was married four times, and had one child:
Hubbell Robinson Jr., a writer, producer, and television executive (married December 29, 1948 – divorced August 18, 1949)
Lou Busch, a ragtime pianist known as "Joe 'Fingers' Carr" (divorced; one daughter, Deborah, born 1950)
John Richard Moore, a founder of Panavision (married 1958 – divorced) 
Jack Wrangler (John Stillman), 1970s and 1980s gay pornography film actor (married 1994, when Whiting was 70 and he was 48 – until his death from emphysema April 7, 2009)

Death
Whiting died on January 10, 2011, aged 86, from natural causes at the Lillian Booth Actors Home in Englewood, New Jersey.

Discography

Albums

Singles
Unrelated B-sides not shown

References

External links
Margaret Whiting Interview NAMM Oral History Library (1995)
Margaret Whiting Discography
Margaret Whiting interviewed on the Pop Chronicles

Sources

Pop ranking from Joel Whitburn's Pop Memories 1890–1954, published in 1986 by Record Research Inc., Menomonee Falls, Wisconsin.
Contributing artists from booklet with the "My Ideal" four CD set by Jasmine Records in 2007; confirmed by Time-Life Music tape set "Late 40s" released in 1991, and by Joel Whitburn's Pop Memories 1890–1954. Some Internet sources give Tex Beneke's orchestra as accompanying Whiting's hit, "A Wonderful Guy", but Beneke claimed Claire Chatwin was the singer on his version: see his album, "Here's To The Ladies Who Sang With The Band" – the latter can also be found here

1924 births
2011 deaths
Cabaret singers
American women jazz singers
American jazz singers
Traditional pop music singers
Dot Records artists
Capitol Records artists
London Records artists
Verve Records artists
Musicians from Los Angeles
Burials at Westwood Village Memorial Park Cemetery
Jazz musicians from California
21st-century American women